James Lawlor is the name of:

Jim Lalor (1878–1956), Irish hurler
Jimmy Lawlor (1933–2012), Irish  footballer